Sol Patches is a Chicago actor, writer, and rapper who uses they/them pronouns. They began their career in Chicago's theater and poetry scene, and released their first mixtape As2Water Hurricanes at the end of June 2016 on SoundCloud.

Patches was born and raised in Chicago. They are heavily influenced by Chicago's queer Latino and black femme culture through their theater and poetry involvement. They appeared in the 2016 production of the play Kill Floor at the American Theater Company in Chicago.

References

Living people
American rappers
21st-century American rappers
Year of birth missing (living people)